Maximiliano "Maxi" Gómez González (born 14 August 1996) is a Uruguayan professional footballer who plays as a striker for Süper Lig club Trabzonspor and the Uruguay national team.

Having begun his career with Defensor Sporting, he moved to Spain in 2017, where he made 167 La Liga appearances and scored 51 goals for Celta and Valencia.

A full international for Uruguay since 2017, Gómez was selected for the FIFA World Cup in 2018 and 2022 and the Copa América in 2019 and 2021.

Club career

Defensor Sporting
Born in Paysandú, Gómez joined Defensor Sporting's youth setup in 2013, from CA Litoral. He made his first team debut on 15 September 2015, coming on as a late substitute for Héctor Acuña in a 1–0 away win against Universitario for the year's Copa Sudamericana.

Gómez made his Primera División debut on 4 October 2015, but in a 0–4 away loss against Nacional. His first senior goal came on 16 October, the last in a 2–3 home defeat against Montevideo Wanderers.

On 31 October 2015, Gómez scored a brace in a 4–1 home routing of Juventud de Las Piedras; he repeated the feat on 20 November in a 2–2 home draw against El Tanque Sisley, and also in a 3–2 home success over Danubio the following 28 February. On 22 May 2016, he scored four goals in a 6–5 away win against El Tanque Sisley, and finished his first season with 14 goals in only 21 matches.

After only four goals in 14 matches in the 2016 campaign, Gómez contributed with ten goals in 12 matches in 2017; highlights included a brace in a 2–0 away win against Danubio on 5 March 2017.

Celta

In May 2017, Gómez signed a five-year deal with La Liga side Celta Vigo, moving abroad for the first time in his career. He made his debut for the club on 19 August, starting and scoring a brace in a 2–3 home loss against Real Sociedad, and finished his debut season with 17 goals from 36 games, seventh highest in the division.

Gómez contributed 13 goals in 2018–19 as Celta finished one place above relegation. This included one on the final day, as they defeated newly crowned champions FC Barcelona 2–0 at Balaídos.

Valencia
On 14 July 2019, Gómez signed a contract with Valencia CF until 2024, with his release clause set at €140 million. The deal saw Valencia pay €14.5 million with Santi Mina and Jorge Sáenz moving in the opposite direction, the latter joining Celta on a two-year loan deal. He made his debut on 24 August away to his former club, playing the first hour of a 1–0 loss before being replaced by Rodrigo.

Gómez scored his first goal for the Che on 14 September, coming off the bench to net at the end of a 5–2 loss to Barcelona at the Camp Nou. Against the same opponents on 25 January 2020, he scored both goals in a 2–0 victory at Mestalla, preserving his team's unbeaten home season and inflicting a first defeat of Quique Setién's spell in charge of the opponents.

In 2021–22, Gómez was sent off twice against Athletic Bilbao, once for two yellow cards in a league match and the latter on 10 February in a Copa del Rey semi-final first leg away at the San Mamés Stadium. In the second instance, he was an unused substitute and was given a straight red card at half time for threatening the assistant referee. He was issued with a two-match suspension and thereby missed the final, which his team lost on penalties to Real Betis.

Trabzonspor
In the summer of 2022, Valencia sought to sell Gómez due to UEFA Financial Fair Play Regulations and to free up a spot on their quota of non-European Union players. He was linked to a move to Fenerbahçe SK, whose sporting director came to negotiate in Spain, but signed a three-year deal with the option of a fourth at fellow Turkish Süper Lig team Trabzonspor on 31 August. The fee was €3 million and his annual salary was set at €1.75 million.

On 6 October 2022, Gómez was sent off after 11 minutes of a 3–1 loss at AS Monaco FC in the UEFA Europa League group stage, for a high boot into the face of Mohamed Camara.

International career
Gómez made his international debut for Uruguay on 10 November 2017 in a goalless friendly away to Poland, as a 74th-minute substitute for Giorgian De Arrascaeta. Manager Óscar Tabárez called him up for the 2018 FIFA World Cup in Russia, where he made his first competitive appearance in the final group game as an added-time replacement in a 3–0 win over the hosts in Samara.

On 26 March 2019, Gómez scored his first international goal to round off a 4–0 victory over Thailand and win the China Cup. He was called up for the Copa América in 2019 and 2021, both in Brazil.

Gómez scored once in 2022 FIFA World Cup qualification, coming on with three minutes remaining against Chile on 8 October 2020 and scoring the winner in a 2–1 victory. He was called up for the final tournament in Qatar, playing two games as a substitute for Darwin Núñez in a group stage elimination.

Personal life
Gómez's older brother Richard, also a footballer, played in Uruguay for Club Atlético Platense. He played for Galician amateurs Mondariz FC while Maxi Gómez was at Celta.

Career statistics

Club

International

Scores and results list Uruguay's goal tally first.

References

External links

1996 births
Living people
Footballers from Paysandú
Uruguayan footballers
Uruguay international footballers
Association football forwards
Defensor Sporting players
RC Celta de Vigo players
Valencia CF players
Trabzonspor footballers
Uruguayan Primera División players
La Liga players
2018 FIFA World Cup players
2019 Copa América players
2021 Copa América players
2022 FIFA World Cup players
Uruguayan expatriate footballers
Uruguayan expatriate sportspeople in Spain
Expatriate footballers in Spain
Uruguayan expatriate sportspeople in Turkey
Expatriate footballers in Turkey